Alfred Otto Herz (14 October 1856 Hoyerswerda, Silesia – 12 July 1905) was a German entomologist who specialised in Lepidoptera and Coleoptera.
He was employed  as a collector and preparator by the Otto Staudinger - Andreas Bang-Haas insect dealership in Dresden.

Otto Herz went on entomological expeditions to  Transcaucasia, Buchara, Persia, Kamchatka, "Jakutien" (on a mammoth-collecting expedition), China, Korea, Japan, Hainan, and Siam partly funded by Nicholas Mikhailovich Romanoff who also purchased material directly from Herz or through Staundinger.

Many of the Lepidoptera collected by Herz were described by Sergei Alphéraky. His collected insects are in the Zoological Museum of the Russian Academy of Science (including the Romanoff insects) other than that sold elsewhere by the dealership.

Tribute
The fish Pungtungia herzi Herzenstein, 1892 was named in honor of Herz, who collected the type specimen.

References

Sources
 Kusnezov, N. J. 1906: [Herz, A. O.] Ann. Mus. Zool. Petersburg 11 I-V.
 Kusnezov, N. J. 1905: [Herz, A. O.] Russk. ent. obozr 5 311-312.

German lepidopterists
1905 deaths
1856 births
German collectors
19th-century German scientists
20th-century German scientists
People from Hoyerswerda
Silesian-German people